Head of Steam, formerly known as the Darlington Railway Centre and Museum, is a railway museum located on the 1825 route of the Stockton and Darlington Railway, which was the world's first steam-powered passenger railway. It is based inside the station building at the North Road railway station. Its exhibits are devoted to the area formerly served by the North Eastern Railway with a particular focus on the Stockton & Darlington Railway and the railway industry of Darlington.In 2022 plans were submitted to expand the museum as part of the Railway Heritage Quarter.

Locomotives
The museum currently has five locomotives on display. Two are owned by the museum, while three are on long-term loan from the National Railway Museum.

Model railway 
The museum holds a large model of the Stockton & Darlington Railway which can be seen in the images below.

References

External links

Head of Steam Museum website
Darlington Borough Council, museum website

Stockton and Darlington Railway
Museums in County Durham
Railway museums in England
Heritage railways in County Durham
Rail transport in Darlington
Buildings and structures in Darlington